The Rachmaninov Festival Orchestra is an orchestra drawing its members from Europe, Russia, Asia and the Americas.

External links 
 Music Director Website
 Rachmaninov Festival
 Rachmaninov Society
 Official YouTube Channel

European orchestras